The Chief Assassin to the Sinister is the second studio album by Three Mile Pilot, released on September 27, 1994 by Headhunter Records.

Track listing

Personnel 
Adapted from The Chief Assassin to the Sinister liner notes.

Three Mile Pilot
 Pall Jenkins – vocals, guitar
 Armistead Burwell Smith IV – bass guitar, piano, cello, backing vocals
 Tom Zinser – drums
Additional musicians
 Jim French – horns (4)
 John Goff – bagpipes (1)
 Denver Lucas – spoken word (5)

Production and additional personnel
 Randy Antler – design
 Donnell Cameron – engineering (1, 5)
 Darryl Harvey – engineering (2–4, 6, 8)
 Three Mile Pilot – production, cover art, photography

Release history

References

External links 
 

1994 albums
Geffen Records albums
Headhunter Records albums
Three Mile Pilot albums